Hamadi is a surname. Notable people with the surname include:

Abdel Wahab al-Hamadi (born 1979), Kuweiti writer
Ahmed Mulay Ali Hamadi (born 1954), Sahrawi diplomat
Ali Al-Hamadi (born 2002), English-Iraqi footballer
Fadane Hamadi (born 1992), Comorian track and field athlete
Hamadi Ould Baba Ould Hamadi (born 1948), Mauritanian politician
Hassane Hamadi, Comorian politician
Muhammad Shamte Hamadi (1907–1964), Zanzibari politician
Najah Hamadi (born 1984), Tunisian footballer
Osama Al Hamady (born 1975), Libyan football player
Sa'dun Hammadi (1930–2007), Iraqi Prime Minister

Patronymic surnames
Surnames from given names